This is a list of Buddhist monasteries in Nepal. They are also called Gumba or Gompa in the local language. Newars call it Bihars; see the List of Mahaviharas of Newar Buddhism. For list of buddhist stupas, see List of stupas in Nepal

References

 
Monasteries,Nepal
Nepal
Lists of religious buildings and structures in Nepal